Alberto Castelvecchi (born April 12, 1962, in Rome), third of four brothers, is an Italian linguist, professor of "Effective Communication and Public Speaking" at Luiss Guido Carli University of Rome, publisher and media personality.

Castelvecchi grew up in Bangkok, where the family moved in 1967. In Rome, he studied philology and linguistics at La Sapienza. He subsequently worked at RAI, where he was conductor of cultural programs for Rai Radio Tre and Rai Radio Due, ("Orione" and "Terza Pagina"). He contributed to Il Messaggero and la Repubblica and Panorama as a communication expert.In 1984 he studied "Italian Dialectology" and "Phonology" and dialect|Dialetto_romanesco, from "Ragazzi di vita" by Pier Paolo Pasolini to "Amore tossico" by Claudio Caligari and slang graffiti on walls. Later, in 1993, he founded his own publishing house with Alessandra Gambetti and Antonella Fabbrini. In 1996 he started to work as a consultant for Omnitel pronto italia and Rai. In 2007 he studied the system of new technologies and web communication,  becoming chief of cultural chapter of ilcannocchiale.it and founding "Mag".
In 1993 he founded the publishing house Castelvecchi with the idea of giving a voice to new authors. Castelvecchi has published Aldo Nove and Isabella Santacroce, as well as Luther Blissett.

In 1987 he co-authored with Luca Serianni one of the most important descriptive grammars of the Italian language, Italiano. Grammatica, sintassi, dubbi''.

In 2022 he has been Advisor to the President of the Senate on Institutional Relations. He is Member of the Scientific Committee at Fondazione Leonardo.  

Alberto Castelvecchi has been also a member of veDrò, a think tank focused on cultural innovation and evolution of politics.

References 

Businesspeople from Rome
Italian publishers (people)
Rai (broadcaster) people
Grammarians of Italian
Living people
Italian journalists
Italian male journalists
1962 births